The Moyel House (Danish: Moyels Gård), also known as the White Mansion (Danish: Det Hvide Palæ), is a listed property at Lyngby Hovedgade 37 in Kongens Lyngby, Lyngby-Taarbæk Municipality, in the northern suburbs of Copenhagen, Denmark.

History

The royal road to Frederiksborg was opened to the public in 1767. It was blocked by boom barriers where a road toll was collected. One of the boom houses was located just south of Kongens Lyngby. It was later converted into a country retreat known as Bomhuset (The Boom House). Its owner acquired more land on the east side of the road.

David Moyel (17531831), a furniture dealer, purchased the property in 1804. In 1807, he constructed the White Mansion with two identical apartments which were let out to citizens from Copenhagen during the summer season. The two kitchens were located in the basement. Moyel was also the owner of the neighboring building Bomhuset.

Architecture
The two-storey building is designed in the Neoclassical style. It is five bays long and five bays wide, giving it an almost cubic appearance. The main entrance in the north gable is marked by a granite portal with sandstone decorations. Ionic order pilasters flank the three central bays of the facade.

Today
The building is now home to the Institute for Orthomolecular Medicine.

References

External links

 Institut for Orthomolekylær Medicin
 Source

Listed buildings and structures in Lyngby-Taarbæk Municipality
Listed residential buildings in Copenhagen
Residential buildings completed in 1807